Ignacio Pérez Sierra (19 December 1934 – 16 November 2009) was a Colombian footballer. He was a member of the Colombia national football team at the 1962 FIFA World Cup which was held in Chile.

Career
Born in Medellín, Pérez played club football for Once Caldas, Independiente Medellín, Unión Magdalena, Santa Fe and Deportivo Pereira.

Personal
In November 2009, Pérez died from a heart attack in Medellín.

References

External links

1934 births
2009 deaths
Footballers from Medellín
Colombian footballers
Colombia international footballers
1962 FIFA World Cup players
Once Caldas footballers
Independiente Medellín footballers
Unión Magdalena footballers
Independiente Santa Fe footballers
Deportivo Pereira footballers
Categoría Primera A players
Association football midfielders